1 (sometimes also known as The Motors 1) is the debut studio album by English rock band The Motors, originally released in October 1977. Three singles came from the album, "Dancing the Night Away", "Be What You Gotta Be" and "Cold Love".

American band Cheap Trick covered "Dancing The Night Away" for their album Next Position Please in 1983.

Background and production
The Motors signed for Virgin Records on 13 May 1977. The Motors then consisted of Nick Garvey (lead vocals, guitars), Andrew McMaster (bass, keyboards, vocals), Ricky Slaughter (drums) and Rob Hendry (guitar, vocals). Soon afterwards Hendry was replaced by Bram Tchaikovsky.

The new line-up began by touring with the Heavy Metal Kids in June 1977. After the tour they then began recording the album with the record producer Robert John "Mutt" Lange and released "Dancing the Night Away" / "Whiskey and Wine", their debut single off the album in September 1977. The single climbed to number 42 in the UK Singles Chart and spent four weeks in the charts. The track was extended to go onto the album, which they released as a 12-inch single. Two other singles were also released from the album, "Be What You Gotta Be" and "Cold Love", but they failed to chart.

The album was released in October 1977. It entered the UK Albums Chart on 22 October 1977 and climbed to number 46 and spent four weeks in the chart. In the Melody Maker album chart it peaked at number 30. The album was re-released on CD on 22 March 1991 by Blue Plate / Virgin (Catalogue No 1821) and in 2006 by Captain Oi! Records (Catalogue No AHOYCD 276) with bonus tracks.

The album cover was designed by Cooke Key Associates for Virgin Records. The design of the album cover was altered for the US market, with a larger "The Motors" logo. The  image of the band and the name of the album "1" were both removed, therefore implying that the title of the album was The Motors.

Track listing

Bonus tracks

Charts

Personnel
The Motors
Nick Garvey — vocals, guitar
Bram Tchaikovsky — guitar, vocals
Andy McMaster — bass guitar, synthesizer
Ricky Slaughter (Ricky Wernham) — drums
Technical
Mick Glossop, Malcolm Heeley, Gary Edwards - engineers

References

1977 debut albums
Albums produced by Robert John "Mutt" Lange
Virgin Records albums
The Motors albums